Tatarella is an Italian surname. Notable people with the surname include:

 Giuseppe Tatarella (1935–1999), Italian politician
 Salvatore Tatarella (1947–2017), Italian politician

Italian-language surnames